The Equestrian Individual Freestyle Test Grade Ia event at the 2008 Summer Paralympics was held in the Hong Kong Olympic Equestrian Centre on 11 September.

The competition was assessed by a ground jury composed of five judges placed at locations designated E, H, C, M, and B. Each judge rated the competitors' performances with scores out of 10 for technical difficulty and artistic merit. The ten scores from the jury were then summed to determine a rider's total percentage score.

The event was won by Sophie Christiansen, representing .

Ground jury

Results

References

Equestrian at the 2008 Summer Paralympics